Ah, Wilderness! is a 1932 play by Eugene O'Neill.

Ah, Wilderness may also refer to:

 Ah, Wilderness! (film), a 1935 film adaptation directed by Clarence Brown and starring Wallace Beery 
 "Ah! Wilderness!", an episode of The Suite Life of Zack & Cody